German submarine U-1018 was a German Type VIIC/41 U-boat, built during World War II for service in the Battle of the Atlantic. The U-boat was fitted with the Schnorchel underwater-breathing apparatus which enabled her to stay under-water for extended periods thus avoiding detection by enemy warships.

Design
German Type VIIC/41 submarines were preceded by the heavier Type VIIC submarines. U-1018 had a displacement of  when at the surface and  while submerged. She had two shafts and two  propellers.

U-1018 was fitted with five  torpedo tubes (four fitted at the bow and one at the stern), fourteen torpedoes, one  SK C/35 naval gun, (220 rounds), one  Flak M42 and two  C/30 anti-aircraft guns. The boat had a complement of between forty-four and sixty.

Service history
She was completed in Hamburg in April 1944, and spent the rest of 1944 training with the 31st U-boat Flotilla. An accident took place during U-1018's work-up period in the Baltic on 17 June which killed one crew member (Obersteuermann Walter Nellsen) and wounded two. In December 1944, she was moved from Kiel to Horten Naval Base in Norway to join 11th U-boat Flotilla, before departing on 21 January 1945 to patrol the Western Approaches of the English Channel under the command of Kapitänleutnant Walter Burmeister.

Combat role
On 27 February 1945 she attacked convoy BTC 81 about seven miles from Lizard Point, Cornwall (at ). U-1018 launched a torpedo which hit the Norwegian freighter  which sank within a few minutes, resulting in the death of five of the freighter's Norwegian crew, a 16-year-old British cabin boy, Thomas Boniface, and two British Royal Navy gunners, (part of the DEMS gun crew) including former professional footballer Charlie Sillett.

The convoy escort ships immediately launched heavy counter-attacks. Less than two hours later, U-1018 was sunk by depth charges dropped by  under the command of Cdr. Benjamin Andrew Rogers, RD, RNR. Only two members of the crew of 53 survived.

Summary of raiding history

See also
 Battle of the Atlantic (1939-1945)

References

Bibliography

External links

World War II submarines of Germany
German Type VIIC/41 submarines
U-boats sunk by depth charges
U-boats commissioned in 1944
U-boats sunk in 1945
World War II shipwrecks in the English Channel
1944 ships
Ships built in Hamburg
U-boats sunk by British warships
Maritime incidents in February 1945